is a 2017 third-person shooter game developed and published by Nintendo for the Nintendo Switch. It was released on July 21, 2017 as a direct sequel to Splatoon, including a new story-driven single-player mode and various online multiplayer modes. An expansion pack for the single-player mode titled Octo Expansion was subsequently released as downloadable content (DLC) on June 13, 2018.

The game received generally positive reviews upon release. As of March 2022, Splatoon 2 had sold over 13.3 million copies worldwide, selling more than twice as many as its predecessor and making it one of the best-selling Switch games. A sequel, Splatoon 3, was released on the Nintendo Switch on September 9, 2022.

Gameplay

Like its predecessor, Splatoon 2 is a third-person shooter in which players control characters, known as Inklings and Octolings (Octolings being a new addition to Splatoon 2), and use colored ink as ammunition. Ink is also used to cover the ground, or any paintable surface, in order to swim or refill their ink tanks. Inklings and Octolings can morph between humanoid, or kid form, where they switch from walking and shooting, into squid form where they can quickly swim through ink of their own color, and replenish their ink supply, as well as return to full health.

The sequel adds new main, sub and special weapons, including dual-wield pistols called Dualies that allow the player to perform dodge rolls, shotgun-like weapons called Brellas that enable defensive maneuvers with folding shields, and jetpacks known as Inkjets. Like the previous game, it features the standard Turf War mode for Regular Battles, in which two four-player teams have three minutes to cover the most turf with their color of ink. Splatoon 2 also maintains the first game's rotation of Splat Zones, Tower Control and Rainmaker for Ranked Battles, which is unlocked when you reach level ten, while also adding a new Clam Blitz mode. League Battles allow players to form teams with friends playing the same modes as in Ranked Battles, however, they removed tri-squad as a possible team option, making it so you can only create teams of two or four and for ranked battles the time limit is five minutes instead of three. A new mode, Salmon Run, allows up to four players to team up cooperatively to tackle waves of enemies called Salmonids and collect Boss Salmonids' eggs.

Once per month until July 2019, a "Splatfest" event was held in which players could choose one of two teams, usually based on common debates such as heroes versus villains and pancakes versus waffles. In addition, there were two collaborations during these Splatfests: Nickelodeon's Rise of the Teenage Mutant Ninja Turtles and Super Smash Bros. Ultimate. Splatfest themes were usually announced two weeks in advance, and players were given the ability to choose their team in the game's lobby. Themes were usually region-specific and happen at different times of the month. The only mode available in a Splatfest was Turf War, but players could choose between normal and pro modes. Winning battles awarded 'clout' to the winning team, and at the end of the Splatfest, the winning side was decided by evaluating popularity and clout earned in both battle modes. All players who participate earn rare rewards, but players on the winning team receive a slightly higher cut. In July 2019, Nintendo announced that the final regular Splatfest would be held that month. However, bonus rematches of previous Splatfests were held in May 2020, August 2020, and October 2020. A Splatfest celebrating the 35th anniversary of Super Mario Bros. was held in January 2021.

The game features a single-player campaign called Hero Mode, in which the player rescues captured Zapfish across various levels while fighting off evil Octarians. Unlike the previous game's single-player campaign which had a pre-determined weapon set, the player can now earn various weapons, some of which are required when playing levels for the first time. In addition to Sunken Scrolls that unlock artwork and in-game lore, players can collect Power Orbs to upgrade their Hero Mode weapons, and tickets that can be exchanged for temporary reward boosts in multiplayer battles, such as increased experience to level up quicker or more in-game money. Using a single weapon to beat all of the Hero Mode levels grants the player a Hero Weapon Replica (identical to the campaign weapon) to use in multiplayer matches. Players can also play multiplayer online through an internet connection or play locally, although local play requires multiple consoles and copies of the game. The game also features LAN support with an adapter accessory for local private tournaments. The game supports amiibo figures, which allow players to store their character's custom look and unlock additional content. Free post-release updates and events are ongoing.

Story
Splatoon 2 takes place approximately two years after the final Splatfest of Splatoon, in which the pop idol Marie defeated her cousin and fellow Squid Sister, Callie. After having drifted apart in the months following the event, Marie worries that Callie was negatively affected by the result. After leaving Inkopolis to see her parents, Marie returns home to discover that the Great Zapfish that powers the city has gone missing again, as has Callie. Fearing that the evil Octarians are once more involved, Marie takes up her role as Agent 2 of the New Squidbeak Splatoon and recruits an Inkling from Inkopolis Square, the player character, to become Agent 4 and investigate.

With assistance from Marie and weapons expert Sheldon, Agent 4 makes their way through Octo Canyon fighting the Octarians and recovering several stolen Zapfish, including ones powering the Octarians' machines. They discover that Callie herself has sided with the Octarians after being brainwashed by their leader, DJ Octavio, who has escaped his imprisonment after his defeat in the first games story and once more is using the Great Zapfish to power his brand new DJ stage, the Octobot King II. Marie arrives with Sheldon and frees Callie from her mind control, allowing them to help Agent 4 defeat Octavio. With the Great Zapfish safely returned to Inkopolis and DJ Octavio defeated, the Squid Sisters happily reunite and resume their career in Music.

Release

A limited-time global multiplayer demo for the game, known as the "Splatoon 2 Global Testfire", was released in March 2017. A special edition of Nintendo Treehouse Live was streamed during the first session, in which members of the Nintendo Treehouse participated in the demo. Similarly to the demo of the original game, it was only available to play for a specific time period, across six one-hour play sessions in one weekend. Another demo session demonstrating the game's Splatfest events was held on July 15, 2017.

The game was released worldwide on July 21, 2017. In Japan and Europe, neon-green and neon-pink Joy-Con controllers and Splatoon-themed Pro Controllers were released alongside the game. A game card-free version, which features a download code inside a game case instead of a game card, was also released in Japan, as well as a Switch hardware bundle including a download code for the game. A similar bundle was released in the United States as a Walmart exclusive.

New Amiibo figures of new Inkling Girl, Boy and Squid designs from Splatoon 2 were released alongside the game. These figures, alongside previous Splatoon figures, unlock exclusive in-game clothing and music tracks and allow the player to save a loadout of weapons and clothing to the figure so they can be readily accessed at any time. Characters with these saved load-outs can be posed alongside the player for taking screenshots. Amiibo figures of Pearl and Marina from Off the Hook were released on July 13, 2018, and feature similar functionality to those already released, while a final trio of figures of Octoling Girl, Boy and Octopus designs were released in Japan and Europe on November 9, 2018, and in North America on December 7, 2018.

Like the previous game, Splatoon 2 was continually updated post-release with free content. From launch, at least one new weapon was added to the game almost every week, while new stages and game modes were added at irregular intervals. In late April 2018, this changed to having a large group of weapons added every month instead, with new stages continuing to be added until October 2018. While these regular updates were originally due to continue for around a year after the game's launch, with monthly regional Splatfest events being held for around two years, the regular updates were later extended to last until the end of 2018. An expansion pack for the game's single-player mode, titled Octo Expansion, was released on June 13, 2018.

The game's content update in December 2018 was announced as the final one, albeit with balancing patches and Splatfest events due to continue into Summer 2019, but it was later revealed that more smaller updates would release until July 2019.

Promotion
Prior to Splatoon 2s reveal, clips of the game were featured in the announcement trailer for the Nintendo Switch. Its unanticipated appearance led to speculation by the media and public over whether or not the footage shown was that from a port of Splatoon or a sequel. It was also presented in the trailer in a way that promoted the game as an eSport, following investments by Nintendo in Splatoon eSport tournaments in late 2016.

Splatoon 2 was officially unveiled to the public during the Nintendo Switch reveal presentation held in Tokyo on January 13, 2017, where it was announced for release in Q2/Q3 2017. The reveal was accompanied by a trailer featuring the game's new maps and weapons, and an on-stage appearance of producer Hisashi Nogami in-character as a scientist from the Squid Research Lab, a fictional scientific group from the game, which appeared in various promotional material for the original Splatoon.

Similarly to the first game, Splatoon 2 features Splatfest events that include crossovers with other brands, both from other Nintendo properties such as Super Smash Bros. Ultimate and third-party franchises including Teenage Mutant Ninja Turtles, McDonald's, Uniqlo, Nike, Sanrio, Meiji, and Pocky.

Other media
A manga series based on the game and illustrated by Sankichi Hinodeya began serialization in Shogakukan's CoroCoro Comic magazine in May 2017. It was published in North America by Viz Media in late 2017. A motion comic adaptation of the manga was announced in July 2017 and released on YouTube the following month.

Splatune 2, a two-disc official soundtrack featuring music from the game by Toru Minegishi, Ryo Nagamatsu, and Shiho Fujii, was published by Enterbrain in Japan on November 29, 2017, debuting at number eight on Billboard Japan Hot Albums chart. A second soundtrack album, Octotune, was released in Japan on July 18, 2018. This album features tracks added in the game's Octo Expansion DLC and other post-release updates, as well as a recording of the game's first live concert. It peaked at number five on the Hot Albums chart.

Similarly to the first game, a series of real-life virtual concerts featuring the game's signature band Off the Hook have been performed in various locations. Their first concert was held at Tokaigi 2018 in Japan on February 10, 2018, a second was performed at Polymanga in Switzerland on March 31, 2018, a third concert which featured a new song, "Nasty Majesty" from Splatoon 2s Octo Expansion, was performed at NicoNico Chokaigi in Japan on April 28, 2018, a fourth concert was performed at Tokaigi Game Party 2019 in Japan on January 26, 2019, which featured more songs from the Octo Expansion, and was the first concert to only feature Pearl and Marina, and a two-day concert featuring both the Squid Sisters and Off The Hook was performed at Nintendo Live 2019 on October 13–14, 2019, which featured performances based on previous concerts.

Reception

Splatoon 2 received "generally favorable" reviews, according to review aggregator Metacritic. Critics stated that Splatoon 2 retained what was great about the original game while adding new features to keep the game fresh. Nintendo Life praised the improved single-player campaign. Destructoid and Game Informer criticised the accessibility within the game's multiplayer modes—weapons couldn't be changed between matches at that time (though this was added in a later update), no split-screen play, and the Salmon Run mode only being playable online at certain times—but praised the new weapons and gameplay. The Verge blamed the lack of a built-in voice chat feature and ease of viewing the map for taking away from the multiplayer experience, yet still calling the game an improvement over the original. GameSpot cited Splatoon 2 as "a fresh take on the already unique shooter" but pointed out that using a mobile app for voice communication made multiplayer more complicated than it needed to be. Game Revolution and GamesRadar both praised the colorful artstyle and depth of the multiplayer combat. IGN gave the game a score of 8.3/10—higher than the initial score of the original game but lower than its re-review—praising the "addicting" Salmon Run mode and improved graphics, while making similar complaints about the game's matchmaking system. Electronic Gaming Monthly and Nintendo World Report both stated that the game felt "more like Splatoon 1.5" than a true sequel to the original, but nonetheless complimented the game's new additions.

Eurogamer ranked the game 17th on their list of the "Top 50 Games of 2017", while Polygon ranked it 43rd on their list of the 50 best games of 2017. The Verge named Splatoon 2 as one of their 15 Best Games of 2017. The game was nominated for "Best Switch Game" in both Destructoids Game of the Year Awards 2017 and IGN's Best of 2017 Awards, the latter of which also nominated it for "Best Shooter" and "Best Multiplayer".

Sales
Splatoon 2 debuted second on the UK software sales chart in its launch week, behind Crash Bandicoot N. Sane Trilogy. It had 59% better first week sales than Splatoon and became the third biggest launch of a Switch game in that country. In Japan, Splatoon 2 sold roughly 648,000 copies at retail within the first few days of its launch. Including download copies, the game had sold over two million in Japan by early 2018, making it the first home console game to do so in the country since 2010's Wii Party.  The game shipped 1.56 million copies in Japan and 3.61 million copies worldwide in its first fiscal quarter on sale. By June 2020, the game had sold 10.71 million copies worldwide,  making it the ninth best-selling Switch game worldwide. As of March 2022, ''Splatoon 2'' had sold over 13.30 million copies worldwide, selling twice as much as its predecessor, and making it one of the best-selling Switch games.

Awards

Sequel 

On February 17, 2021, during a Nintendo Direct, Nintendo announced a teaser trailer for Splatoon 3, which was released for the Nintendo Switch on September 9, 2022. The teaser trailer revealed gameplay similar to that of Splatoon 2, and revealed new items, weapons, and a new apocalyptic setting.

Notes

References

External links
 
 
 

2017 video games
Multiplayer and single-player video games
Nintendo Entertainment Planning & Development games
Nintendo games
Nintendo Switch games
Nintendo Switch-only games
Splatoon
Third-person shooters
Video games developed in Japan
Video games featuring protagonists of selectable gender
Video games with downloadable content
Video games scored by Toru Minegishi
Video games that use Amiibo figurines
Video games with expansion packs
Video game sequels
Fiction about mind control
Video games scored by Ryo Nagamatsu
Post-apocalyptic video games